The 2008 Melbourne Cup, the 148th running of Australia's most prestigious Thoroughbred horse race, was run on Tuesday, 4 November 2008, starting at 3:00 pm local time (0400 UTC). It was won by Viewed.

On 3 December 2008, Luca Cumani, trainer of second-place Bauer, announced that an inquiry was underway into treatment Bauer received on the Thursday prior to the race. The treatment was a form of physio therapy that is illegal to administer within 7 days of a race; as a result of the treatment, Bauer could have been stripped of his second place. However, Racing Victoria announced on 4 December that Bauer would not be disqualified.

Field 
The official field for the cup including horses scratched after the field was finalised.

Notes
 Apprentice jockey.
Horses in barriers to the outside of the scratched horse will move inwards.
 Yellowstone scratched by vets, after failing to recover from a hip injury sustained last week.
 Gallopin did not finish
 Zarita scratched, by trainer due to respiratory infection.
 a probe into treatment Bauer received prior to the race could have resulted in the horse being stripped of second place

Results 
The race was won by the Bart Cummings trained horse Viewed, with Honolulu officially last as Gallopin did not finish the race.

References

2008
Melbourne Cup
Melbourne Cup
2000s in Melbourne
November 2008 sports events in Australia